The word chromatophore may refer to:
 Chromatophore, a kind of pigmented cell or organ found in some animals.
 Chromatophore (bacteria), a vesicle associated with the cell membrane used to photosynthesize.
 Chloroplast, also called a chromatophore in some organisms
 "Chromatophore", a song by BT from _ (album)